Shani Rigsbee  (born May 1, 1967, Hot Springs, Arkansas) is a singer-songwriter, producer, and actress who is known for her support for humanitarian causes. In 2007, she released At The Casbah, a film based on the One Thousand and One Nights collection of stories. Rigsbee and the Iranian pop star Andy Madadian toured internationally for many years, and they have performed benefits for various charitable organizations. They sang for the Dalai Lama in 2014. Rigsbee and Madadian were married in 2011. She was born in Arkansas and lives in Los Angeles.

Discography

Albums

Filmography

Soundtrack

References

External links
 Shani Rigsbee official Facebook  
 Shani Rigsbee Twitter
 Shanirigsbee Instagram
 Shani Rigsbee YouTube

Living people
American women singer-songwriters
Actors from Hot Springs, Arkansas
Singer-songwriters from Arkansas
Musicians from Hot Springs, Arkansas
1967 births
21st-century American women